Frank Farrington may refer to:

 Frank Farrington (actor) (1873–1924), American silent film actor
 Frank Farrington (rugby league) (1926–2014), Australian rugby league player
 Frank G. Farrington (1872–1933), American lawyer and politician from Maine